Grandidier's tufted-tailed rat (Eliurus grandidieri) is a species of rodent from the family Nesomyidae. Morphological evidence suggests that Grandidier's tufted-tailed rat is most closely related to Petter's tufted-tailed rat, E. petteri. However, Grandidier's tufted-tailed rat is the smaller of the two species.

Distribution and range 
Grandidier's tufted-tailed rat is endemic to Madagascar. It resides in both the Northern Highlands and the northern part of the Central Highlands in eastern Madagascar.

Habitat and ecology 
Grandidier's tufted-tailed rat is present in sclerophyllous forest and is presumed to be a partly scansorial species. The species is forest depended and has not been captured outside of forest or in alpine grasslands, though it may occur just below the tree line.

Female Grandidier's tufted-tailed rats are believed to give birth to up to three young.

Conservation status 
Grandidier's tufted-tailed rat is listed as Least Concern on the IUCN Red List due to its widely dispersed localities. The population trend of the species, however, is unknown. There is deforestation in the habitat of the Grandidier's tufted-tailed rat for conversion to cultivated land, but there is not enough population loss from this deforestation for the species to be listed as more threatened. The species is located in three protected areas: the Anjanaharibe-Sud and Manongarivo Special Reserves and the Marojejy National Park.

References 

Mammals described in 1998
Taxa named by Michael D. Carleton
Eliurus